Magellan Health Inc. (formerly Magellan Health Services Inc.), is an American for-profit managed health care company and subsidiary of Centene that's focused on special populations, complete pharmacy benefits and other specialty areas of healthcare. Magellan supports innovative ways of accessing better health through technology, while remaining focused on the critical personal relationships that are necessary to achieve a healthy, vibrant life. Magellan's customers include health plans and other managed care organizations, employers, labor unions, various military and governmental agencies and third-party administrators. It ranked 390 on the Fortune 500 in 2021.

History 
The company began as the psychiatric hospital chain Charter Medical, headquartered in Macon, Georgia. In 1992, the company filed for Chapter 11 bankruptcy, stemming from debt incurred as a result of the 1988 management-led takeover.

After recovering from bankruptcy, it moved its headquarters to Atlanta in 1994. Acquiring a major stake in Green Spring Health Services Inc., a managed care company based in Columbia, Maryland, the company re-structured into a new holding company, changing its name to Magellan Health Services. In 1999 the company moved to Green Spring's old headquarters in Columbia, Maryland. In 2004, the company headquarters moved to Connecticut. In 2014, the company moved its headquarters from Connecticut to Arizona.

On January 4, 2021, it was announced Centene Corporation would acquire the company for $2.2 billion. On January 4, 2022, the acquisition was completed.

References

American companies established in 1969
Health care companies established in 1969
Health care companies based in Arizona
Psychiatric hospitals in the United States
1969 establishments in Georgia (U.S. state)
Companies that filed for Chapter 11 bankruptcy in 1992
Companies formerly listed on the Nasdaq
Companies based in Phoenix, Arizona
American corporate subsidiaries
2022 mergers and acquisitions
Centene Corporation